Theodore Roosevelt is a 2022 American television documentary miniseries directed by Malcolm Venville. The two-part miniseries chronicles the life of Theodore Roosevelt, the twenty-sixth President of the United States and premiered on May 30, 2022, on History.

Episodes

Main cast
Rufus Jones as Theodore Roosevelt
Aubrey Shelton as William McKinley
Mark Elderkin as Leonard Wood

See also
 Washington (2020 History Channel miniseries)
 Grant (2020 History Channel miniseries)
 Abraham Lincoln (2022 History Channel miniseries)

References

External links

2020s American television miniseries
Cultural depictions of Theodore Roosevelt
Cultural depictions of William McKinley
Historical television series
Television series based on actual events
Television series set in the 19th century
Television series set in the 20th century
Films directed by Malcolm Venville
American television films
American biographical films
American films based on actual events
Television series about presidents of the United States
Cultural depictions of William Howard Taft